Footballer of the Year in Russia may refer to:
Footballer of the Year in Russia (Sport-Express),  annual award given by Sport-Express daily
Footballer of the Year in Russia (Futbol), annual award given by Futbol weekly